Svetlana Timoshinina (born 15 July 1973) is a Russian diver. She competed at the 1996 Summer Olympics, the 2000 Summer Olympics and the 2004 Summer Olympics.

References

External links
 

1973 births
Living people
Russian female divers
Olympic divers of Russia
Divers at the 1996 Summer Olympics
Divers at the 2000 Summer Olympics
Divers at the 2004 Summer Olympics
Divers from Moscow